Distocupes is a monotypic genus of beetles in the family Cupedidae, the reticulated beetles. It contains the single species Distocupes varians. It is endemic to eastern Australia, including Tasmania. It is about 12 millimeters long and dark brown to black in color with a coat of lighter scales. Little is known about its biology.

References

External links

Monotypic Archostemata genera
Beetles of Australia
Cupedidae